
Honley is a large village in West Yorkshire, England. Historically part of the West Riding of Yorkshire, it is situated near to Holmfirth and Huddersfield, and on the banks of the River Holme in the Holme Valley. According to the 2011 Census it had a population of 6,474, a growth of 577 from the 2001 Census

Community
The annual Honley Agricultural Show takes place on the second Saturday of June. The show has used farmland between Honley and Meltham, and more recently farmland in Farnley Tyas. Honley has both female and male voice choirs.

There are three schools in the village. Honley Infant and Nursery School for ages 3–7, Honley Junior School for ages 7–11 and Honley High School which after abolishing its sixth form college is now for ages 11–16.

Transport

Rail
Honley railway station opened on 1 July 1850, on the Penistone Line. It connects the village to Huddersfield and Sheffield with an hourly service.

Bus
There are regular bus services to Huddersfield, Holmfirth and Meltham. Most bus services are operated by the First West Yorkshire and Team Pennine

Church
The parish church is St Mary's, a Grade II listed mostly Victorian church, constructed in 1843 by Robert Dennis Chantrell, with later additions in 1888 and 1909. The church was built on the remains of an earlier church, known as 'Old Peg' built in 1759. It is surrounded by a burial ground containing inscribed tombstones with remnants of a set of village stocks. Though an earlier building was possibly constructed in 1503.

Sport

Honley F.C. fields junior teams at under-6 level to under-17 levels. The teams play in the Huddersfield Junior Football League, and play competitive seven-a-side matches from under-7s to under-10s and eleven-a-side matches from under-11s to under-17s. An adult side with three teams plays in the Huddersfield and District Association Football League. The 'A' team is in the second division, the 'B' team in reserve division one, and the 'C' team in reserve division three.

Honley also has teams in the Huddersfield Cricket League. 

On 6 July 2014, Stage 2 of the 2014 Tour de France from York to Sheffield, passed through the village.

Notable people

 General Sir Clement Armitage, General Officer Commanding 1st Infantry Division
 Biff Byford, singer with heavy metal band Saxon.
Alonzo Drake, Yorkshire County Cricketer, born c.1885, d. 14 February 1919. Buried in Honley Cemetery. 
 John Dyson (1913–1991), first-class cricketer
Mary A Jagger, (1849-1936), author of The History of Honley, published in 1914. She was also the first woman Postmistress in England. 
 France Littlewood (1863–1941), a socialist activist.
 Captain Sydney Liversedge (1897–1979), First World War flying ace, was born in Honley.
 Dora Thewlis (1880–1976), suffragette, was born in Honley.
 David Bintley, Director of the Birmingham Royal Ballet and Artistic Director of the National Ballet of Japan. Born in Honley and former head of Maths at Honley High School.
 Jon Stead, ex-professional footballer

Gallery

References

External links

 Honley Cemetery
 Honley Football Club
 Honley Male Voice Choir
 Honley Ladies Choir
 Honley Library
 Honley Agricultural Show
 Honley Village Community Trust
 Trinity Church –  Methodist/URC
 St Mary's Church
 Reins Mill, Honley
 Reins Mill, Honley

 
Villages in West Yorkshire
Holme Valley
Geography of Holmfirth
Towns and villages of the Peak District